Angela Roth, commonly called Arella, is a fictional character from DC Comics. She is the pacifist mother of the superheroine Raven in the Teen Titans comics and animated series. She is the reluctant lover and wife of the all-powerful interdimensional demon Trigon, who had cunningly seduced her, in human form, to have someone to rule beside him and bear a half-human, half-demon daughter who becomes Raven.

Fictional character biography
Born in Gotham City, Angela Roth was a depressed, aimless teenager who fell in with Cultists after running away from home, arrives at their church cold & hungry, is promised to be fed & sheltered in exchange for taking part in a secret ritual to appeal to Trigon, who was to manifest on Earth. Although she knew Trigon was a demon by origin, she thought his handsome human form was authentic. After she married him and they made love, Angela saw Trigon's true form. He sent her back to Earth, pregnant. Angela attempted to kill herself with sleeping pills in an abandoned alleyway. Instead of dying, however, she was taken to the Temple Azarath, located between all dimensions. It was there that she was taught pacifism and had her name changed to Arella (which meant Messenger Angel to the Azarathians).

Soon after giving birth to Raven, she gave up her maternal care to Azar, the high priestess. She rarely saw Raven for quite some time, but took over guardianship of Raven upon Azar's death when Raven was about ten years old.

When Raven was 18 years of age, she fled Azarath to seek help from Earth's superheroes to stop Trigon's invasion. This resulted in the New Teen Titans. Raven briefly returned to Azarath, asking her mother for help. Arella refused and sent her back to Earth. When Raven was being held as a prisoner by Trigon, Arella decided to leave Azarath to help her teammates rescue her. Soon after, Trigon was sealed away in another dimension. Arella agreed to go along with him in an attempt to block him from returning through the portal.

Some time later, Raven finally gave in to her father's control. Arella was transported to Azarath, which was promptly destroyed by Trigon's minions. She was among the few survivors. Arella followed the Teen Titans to Earth in order to help them in their fight against Trigon and release her daughter. She watched as Raven was used to destroy her father and then vanish.

Arella traveled the world, trying to find her daughter. When she finally found her, they were both taken prisoner by cultists, under the control of Brother Blood. After spending some time with her daughter in Blood's fortress, they were freed by the Teen Titans.

After this event, Arella established a ranch that would serve as a sanctuary to troubled women. She intended to make the place like a new Azarath. However, the Wildebeest Society killed all of the women and the workers, leaving only Arella alive. She was rescued by Deathstroke. She, Deathstroke, and Steve Dayton worked on to free the kidnapped Titans from Jericho's Wildebeest Society. But when Deathstroke was forced to kill his son Jericho, the corrupted souls of Azarath left him and possessed Raven, turning her evil once more. Arella and Danny Chase sacrificed themselves, merging with the souls of Azarath into Phantasm.

In other media

Television
 Arella appears in the Teen Titans episode "The Prophecy", voiced by Virginia Madsen. When Raven escapes to her home dimension of Azarath, she encounters Arella, tending to a flock of doves. Raven begs her mother to help her prevent the prophecy from being fulfilled, but Arella tells her that it is no use and that she must carry out the prophecy to become Trigon's portal to Earth and unleash "the end of all things mortal". It is then revealed that the peaceful interdimensional realm of Azarath has already been destroyed and that Arella's physical self may have perished long ago at the hands of her own demonic "lover", having given her daughter her last words through a telepathic voice-mail of sorts.

Films
Arella appears in a flashback in Justice League vs. Teen Titans, detailing Raven's origin to her fellow Teen Titans. This incarnation was eventually destroyed by Trigon, alongside Azarath, after young Raven unwittingly summoned him in an attempt to learn more about him and herself.

Miscellaneous
In issue 44 of the Teen Titans Go! comic book series, "Red Raven", Arella makes an appearance when Raven travels back to the mystical realm of Azarath, with the entire city fully restored. Raven informs her mother that she has become separated from her negative emotions, but Arella advises her that they must remain a part of her because Raven's negativity has taken the form of "Red Raven" and is causing harm to others, including her teammates.

See also
Raven (DC Comics)
Trigon (comics)
Teen Titans

References

DC Comics female characters
Comics characters introduced in 1981
Characters created by George Pérez
Characters created by Marv Wolfman
Fictional attempted suicides
Fictional pacifists